Philip Stark is an American television and film screenwriter, author, and therapist. A native of Houston, Texas, Stark graduated with a degree in Radio-Television-Film (RTF) from The University of Texas at Austin in 1995.

He is best known for his film Dude, Where's My Car? from 2000, and he wrote the script for a sequel, Seriously Dude, Where's My Car?, which did not make it into production. Prior to this, he was a writer and script editor for That '70s Show and he has also written for South Park. He was also the co-creator of Dog with a Blog.

Stark graduated from Antioch University with a Master's degree in Psychology, and is currently seeing talk therapy clients in private practice. He is also the author of a book on talk therapy, "Dude, Where's My Car-tharsis?"

In 2000, along with his friend, animator Graham Robertson, Stark created the online cartoon parody of the Budweiser "Whassup?" commercial featuring clips from the Super Friends.

References

External links

Living people
American male screenwriters
Jewish American screenwriters
American television writers
American male television writers
People from Houston
Year of birth missing (living people)
Screenwriters from Texas
21st-century American Jews